Blessed Black Wings is the third studio album by American heavy metal band High on Fire. It would be the only with Joe Preston on bass who would be replaced by Jeff Matz.

The tracks "The Face of Oblivion" and "Cometh Down Hessian" are based on stories by horror fiction author H. P. Lovecraft, At the Mountains of Madness and The Hound, respectively. The vinyl version was released as a double LP and contains a bonus track, "Rapid Fire", originally by Judas Priest.

Blessed Black Wings was voted 48th in the '50 Greatest Albums of the 21st Century' by Kerrang! magazine.

Reception
Blessed Black Wings was released to positive reception. Critics in particular praised Steve Albini's production of the album, with criticism mainly being pointed towards Matt Pike's vocals. Eduardo Rivadavia of AllMusic acknowledged Pike's appreciation of Celtic Frost noting the influence of the band in the closing instrumental "Sons of Thunder". Adrien Bergrand of PopMatters praised the album for being more listener-friendly akin to Neurosis's The Eye of Every Storm (also produced by Albini) while noting influence from Motörhead, Slayer, and Entombed. Sam Ubl has stated that Blessed Black Wings and its sharper and more agile sound will appeal to fans of Mastodon's Leviathan.

Accolades

Track listing

Personnel 
 Matt Pike – guitar, vocals
 Des Kensel – drums
 Joe Preston – bass
 Greg Norman – AMP repair
 Produced by Steve Albini and High on Fire
 Engineered by Steve Albini
 Assistant engineers – Russ Arbuthnot, Rob Vester
 Mastered by John Golden
 Visuals by Arik Roper

References

High on Fire albums
2005 albums
Albums produced by Steve Albini
Cthulhu Mythos music